Krivoi Rog (Russian: Кривой Рог) is a 1928 USSR comedian drama propaganda film. The film is now considered a lost film, with no known complete copies remaining.

Plot 
A film about the cultural and educational work in the countryside.
The action takes place during the offensive against the Kulaks. In the village for a short time Red Army soldier arrives, Andrei. He seeks to wrest the youth from influence of the rural priest

See also
List of Ukrainian films
Krivoi Rog, city in Ukraine
List of lost films

References

1928 films
1920s Russian-language films
Soviet black-and-white films
Soviet silent films
Lost Russian films
Soviet propaganda films
1920s lost films
Lost Soviet films
Russian black-and-white films
Russian silent films